Abe Bolar  (March 26, 1909 in Oklahoma City, Oklahoma - February 29, 2000 in Portland, Oregon) was an American double bass player. From 1932-1936 he was a member of the Oklahoma City Blue Devils. He then moved to New York City, where he played with Hot Lips Page (1938–1940), Lucky Millinder (1940–1941), and in Count Basie’s orchestra during the early 1940s. In 1939 and 1940 he made recordings with Pete Johnson. He is the husband of pianist Juanita Bolar.

References

1909 births
2000 deaths
American jazz double-bassists
Male double-bassists
20th-century American musicians
20th-century double-bassists
20th-century American male musicians
American male jazz musicians
Oklahoma City Blue Devils members
Count Basie Orchestra members